Serrone is a comune (municipality) in the Province of Frosinone in the Italian region Lazio, located in the Monti Ernici area about  east of Rome and about  northwest of Frosinone.

Serrone borders the following municipalities: Arcinazzo Romano, Olevano Romano, Paliano, Piglio, Roiate.

References

External links
 Official website 

Cities and towns in Lazio